"I'll Make All Your Dreams Come True"  is a  1965 single that was written by Bernice Ross and Wes Farrell, and performed by Ronnie Dove.

Background
It was Dove's seventh single for Diamond Records and the fifth of eleven releases to make the Top 40 and was arranged by Ray Stevens.  It became his biggest hit on the Billboard Easy Listening charts.

Chart performance

References

1965 singles
Ronnie Dove songs
Songs written by Wes Farrell